Your Face Sounds Familiar is a Greek reality show airing on ANT1. The second season premiered on March 9, 2014 and at the end of every live, the winner of the night will donate the money from the audience's voting (via phone) to a charity of their choice. In Cyprus, the money were given to "Mana" (Mother) organization every week.

Cast

Host and Judges 
The host of the show was once again Maria Bekatorou. Bessy Malfa, Katerina Gagaki and Alexandros Rigas returned as judges for the season while Gerasimos Gennatas was replaced by Takis Zaharatos.

Contestants 
Ten contestants in total competed in the second season; five women and five men. Apostolia Zoi had accepted to participate on the second series of the show, but she cancelled her participation due to personal reasons. Zoi revealed this in an interview with "Ego Weekly" Magazine, during her participation on the third series of the show.

Performances

Week 1 
The premiere aired on March 9, 2014 and winner of the first live was Lefteris Eleftheriou with 24 points. Eleftheriou chose to give the money from the audience voting to the needy children of the municipality of Naxos and small Cyclades.

Week 2 

The second episode aired on March 16, 2014 and the winner was Giannis Savvidakis with 23 points. Savvidakis chose to give the money from the audience voting to the orphanage "Melissa" of Thessaloniki.

Week 3 
The third episode aired on March 23, 2014 and the winner was Pantelis Karanakis with 22 points! And also got 22 points is Giannis Savvidakis!: Karanakis chose to give the money from the audience voting to the needy children of the municipality of Naxos and small Cyclades.

Week 4 
The fourth episode aired on March 30, 2014 and the winner was Giannis Savvidakis with 22 points. Savvidakis chose to give the money from the audience voting to the foundation "Grammi Gia To Paidi".

Week 5 
The fifth episode aired on April 6, 2014 and the winner was Betty Maggira with 22 points. Maggira chose to give the money from the audience voting to "Elpida" foundation, a foundation for kids who suffer from cancer.

Week 6 
The sixth episode aired on April 13, 2014 and the winner was Costas Doxas with 22 points. Doxas chose to give the money from the audience voting to "Chatzikiriakio foundation" of Piraeus.

Week 7 
The seventh episode aired on April 27, 2014 and the winner was Aris Plaskasovitis with 23 points. Plaskasovitis chose to give the money from the audience voting to "Eliza foundation" of Thessaloniki.

After the judges and contestants' scores, Sophia K. and Giannis were tied. Gagaki, who was the president of the judges for the week, chose to give the final 10 points to Giannis and the 9 points to Sophia K. After the combined final scores, two contestants had 21 points. The one who got the highest score from the audience got the highest final place out of the two.

Week 8: Eurovision night 
The eighth episode aired on May 4, 2014 and the winner was Eleftheria Eleftheriou with 23 points. Eleftheriou chose to give the money from the audience voting to "Red Cross" of Cyprus.

After the judges and contestants' scores, Lefteris and Aris were tied. Zaharatos, who was the president of the judges for the week, chose to give the final 5 points to Lefteris and the 4 points to Aris. After the combined final scores, two contestants had 23 points and two contestants had 11 points. The one who got the highest score from the audience got the highest final place out of the two in both situations.

Due to the theme of the night, three of the contestants, who participated in the past in the Eurovision Song Contest, sang their entries; Sophia Vossou sang "I Anixi", Giannis Savvidakis sang "Apopse As Vrethoume" and Eleftheria Eleftheriou sang "Aphrodisiac".

Week 9 
The ninth episode aired on May 11, 2014 and the winner was Giannis Savvidakis with 24 points. Savvidakis chose to give the money from the audience voting to the foundation "Grammi Gia To Paidi".

After the judges and contestants' scores, Pantelis and Aris were tied with 29 points and Costas and Eleftheria were tied with 27 points. Malfa, who was the president of the judges for the week, chose to give the final 9 points to Pantelis, the 8 points to Aris, the 7 points to Costas and the 6 points to Eleftheria. After the combined final scores, two contestants had 9 points. The one who got the highest score from the audience got the highest final place out of the two.

Week 10 
The tenth episode aired on May 16, 2014. Because of the elections, this week's episode aired on Friday and not on Sunday like every week. The winner was Costas Doxas with 24 points. Doxas chose to give the money from the audience voting to "Chatzikiriakio foundation" of Piraeus.

After the judges and contestants' scores, Giannis, Eleftheria and Pantelis were tied with 26 points. Rigas, who was the president of the judges for the week, chose to give the final 7 points to Giannis, the 6 points to Pantelis and the 5 points to Eleftheria. After the combined final scores, three contestants had 11 points. The one who got the highest score from the audience got the highest final place out of the three.

Week 11 
The eleventh episode aired on June 1, 2014. The winner was Pantelis Kanarakis with 24 points. Kanarakis chose to give the money from the audience voting to the orphanage "Melissa" of Thessaloniki.

After the combined final scores, two contestants had 8 points, two contestants had 12 points and three contestants had 18 points. The ones who got the highest score from the audience got the highest final place out of the two or three.

Week 12: Semi-finals 
The twelfth episode aired on June 8, 2014. The winner was Giannis Savvidakis with 23 points. Savvidakis chose to give the money from the audience voting to the foundation "Grammi Gia To Paidi".

After the judges and contestants' scores, Costas and Eleftheria were tied with 32 points. Zaharatos, who was the president of the judges for the week, chose to give the final 8 points to Costas and the 7 points to Eleftheria. After the combined final scores, two contestants had 19 points and two contestants had 9 points. The ones who got the highest score from the audience got the highest final place out of the two.

In the semi-finals, the four contestants with the highest cumulative scores from all 12 weeks were announced and were the ones to compete in the finals. The four finalists were; Giannis Savvidakis with 239 points, Pantelis Kanarakis with 216 points, Costas Doxas with 208 points and Lefteris Eleftheriou with 194 points. It was also the last time the judges were going to score the contestants since the winner is decided only by the audience.

Week 13: Final 
The thirteenth and final live aired on June 15, 2014 and the winner of the show was Giannis Savvidakis. The income from the audience voting for the final, was divided in ten equal parts and was given to all ten foundations that the contestants were representing during the thirteen live shows.

At the beginning of the show, Bekatorou performed the songs "Genghis Khan" by Lakis Jordanelli and "Ksafnika m'agapas" by The Idols. In the second song, she was accompanied by Tonis Sfinos.

Notes
 1.  The points that judges gave in order (Malfa, Rigas, Gagaki, Zaharatos).
 2.  Each contestant gave 5 points to a contestant of their choice.
 3.  Total of both extra and judges' score.
 4.  Result of both extra and judges' score.
 5.  In the final, only the audience voted for the winner and the one with the most votes won the competition.

Results chart 

 indicates the contestant came first that week.
 indicates the contestant came last that week.
 performed but didn't score
 indicates the winning contestant.
 indicates the runner-up contestant.
 indicates the third-place contestant.

Ratings

References

Greek 2
2014 Greek television seasons